John Alcindor (8 or 9 July 1873 – 25 October 1924) was a physician and activist from Trinidad who settled in London. He is known for his role in the African Progress Union, of which he became president in 1921.

Life and career
Alcindor was born in Port of Spain, Trinidad, where he was educated at Saint Mary's College; after winning one of the four Island Scholarships he went to study medicine at Edinburgh University, Scotland, graduating from there with a medical degree in 1899. He then worked in London hospitals, in Plaistow, Hampstead and Camberwell, going into practice on his own around 1907. At this period he played cricket, as a wicket keeper for London teams. In 1911 he married Minnie Martin, a white British woman.

Refused a place in the Royal Army Medical Corps, Alcindor was awarded a Red Cross medal for his work with the wounded at London rail stations during World War I.

Alcindor served as senior district medical officer of the London borough of Paddington from 1921 until his death. As a medical officer he worked under the Poor Law which meant that he could offer free treatment for poor people in their homes. Alcindor was also the secretary of the Poor Law Medical Officers Association.

He is the great-uncle of Kareem Abdul-Jabbar (born Ferdinand Lewis Alcindor, Jr.).

Research 
Alcindor published articles on his research on influenza and tuberculosis. He also wrote about the correlation between cancer and poverty, examining the effects of unhealthy surroundings and poor diet.

Activism
Alcindor associated in the late 1890s with the group around Henry Sylvester Williams and his African Association. They were behind the First Pan-African Conference in 1900, which he attended in London, as a delegate from the Afro-West Indian Society. At the conference he met composer Samuel Coleridge‐Taylor and W. E. B. Du Bois with whom he later developed friendships.

Alcindor became the second president of the African Progress Union in 1921, succeeding John Archer.

Alcindor presided on the first day of the 2nd Pan-African Congress in 1921, with Rev. W. H. Jernagin. He spoke at the 3rd Pan-African Congress in 1923.

Legacy 

In July 2014 a blue heritage plaque in Alcindor's honour, organised by the Nubian Jak Community Trust, was unveiled at the site of Alcindor's surgery, which is now the Medical Centre in Harrow Road, Paddington.

References

Further reading
Black History in Westminster (PDF), pp. 18–19.

1873 births
1924 deaths
20th-century British medical doctors
Trinidad and Tobago emigrants to the United Kingdom
People from Port of Spain
Alumni of the University of Edinburgh Medical School
Black British activists
Black British people in health professions
20th-century Trinidad and Tobago physicians